Charles H. Ham (January 22, 1831 – October 16, 1902) was a Member and President of the Board of General Appraisers.

Education and career

Born on January 22, 1831, in New Hampshire, Ham read law and entered private practice in Chicago, Illinois from 1858 to 1866. He served as appraiser of the Port of Chicago from 1871 to 1885. He was an editorial writer for the Chicago Tribune from 1885 to 1890. He served as assistant treasurer of Cook County, Illinois from 1885 to 1890.

Federal judicial service

Ham was nominated by President Benjamin Harrison on July 2, 1890, to the Board of General Appraisers, to a new seat created by 26 Stat. 131. He was confirmed by the United States Senate on July 16, 1890, and received his commission the same day. He served as President from 1897 to 1902. His service terminated on August 1, 1902, due to his resignation. He was succeeded by Byron Sylvester Waite.

Death

Ham died on October 16, 1902, in Montclair, New Jersey.

References

Sources

External links
 

1831 births
1902 deaths
People from New Hampshire
Members of the Board of General Appraisers
United States Article I federal judges appointed by Benjamin Harrison
19th-century American judges
United States federal judges admitted to the practice of law by reading law